The 6th Dallas-Fort Worth Film Critics Association Awards, honoring the best in film for 2000, were given on January 6, 2001.

Top 10 films
Traffic
Wo hu cang long (Crouching Tiger, Hidden Dragon)
Gladiator *Academy Award for Best Picture* 
O Brother, Where Art Thou?
Almost Famous
Erin Brockovich
Chicken Run
Wonder Boys
Finding Forrester
You Can Count on Me

Winners

Best Actor: 
Russell Crowe – Gladiator
Best Actress: 
Laura Linney – You Can Count on Me
Best Animated Film:
Chicken Run
Best Cinematography:
Crouching Tiger, Hidden Dragon (Wo hu cang long) – Peter Pau
Best Director: 
Steven Soderbergh – Traffic
Best Film:
Traffic
Best Foreign Film:
Crouching Tiger, Hidden Dragon (Wo hu cang long) • Taiwan
Best Supporting Actor:
 Albert Finney – Erin Brockovich
Best Supporting Actress: 
Kate Hudson – Almost Famous
Worst Film:
Battlefield Earth: A Saga of the Year 3000

References

External links
Dallas-Fort Worth Film Critics Association official website

2000
2000 film awards
2000 in Texas